Franz Götz may refer to:

 Franz Götz (politician) (born 1945), German politician
 Franz Götz (pilot) (1913–1980), German Luftwaffe fighter ace